The Hospital and Healthsystem Association of Pennsylvania (HAP) is a statewide membership services organization in Harrisburg, Pennsylvania, that advocates for nearly 250 Pennsylvania acute and specialty care, primary care, subacute care, long-term care, home health, and hospice providers, as well as the patients and communities they serve. HAP is part of the Pennsylvania Health Care Quality Alliance.

References

External links 
 

Medical and health organizations based in Pennsylvania
Organizations based in Harrisburg, Pennsylvania